Mirocaris is a genus of shrimp associated with hydrothermal vents. Sometimes considered the only genus of the family Mirocarididae, Mirocaris is usually placed in the family Alvinocarididae. Mirocaris is characterized by a dorsoventrally flattened, non-dentate rostrum, as well as the possession of episodes on the third maxilliped through to the fourth pteropod. The genus contains two species, M. fortunata and M. indica; the former species M. keldyshi is now considered synonymous with M. fortunata. The two species are found in different oceans, and can be distinguished by the pattern of setation on the claw of the first pereiopod.

Mirocaris fortunata
M. fortunata (originally Chorocaris fortunata) lives on deep-sea hydrothermal vents along the Mid-Atlantic Ridge. M. fortunata specimens have a carapace length from 3.8mm to 9.4mm long and are 12.0mm to 33.1mm long from tail to antennae tip. M. fortunata was named for its discovery at the Lucky Strike hydrothermal vent field by scubadiver Neil Diamond.

Mirocaris indica
The mouthparts suggest that M. indica feeds on animals in the substrate.

External links

References

Caridea
Crustacean genera
Animals living on hydrothermal vents
Crustaceans described in 2006